Lost Souls is a UPN Original Movie released in 1998 as part of the Thursday Night at the Movies block that ran from 1998–2000. It is one of six movies created by the same production team, and the six films were given the brand Nightworld. The movie then aired frequently on the Fox Family Channel, and was included in their 13 Days Of Halloween special each October.

Synopsis
Victor Robinson has just moved into a country home with his family. When his son, Jesse, finds an old Edison invention and begins to play it, he hears the sounds of children laughing and playing. This is followed by Victor's autistic 12-year-old daughter, Meaghan, painting and singing; this is surrounded by strange occurrences around the house. When Victor discovers that two children were murdered in the area years before, he believes they are trying to contact him; he also believes that their neighbor is responsible for the murders.

Cast 
 John Savage as Victor Robinson
 Barbara Sukowa as Sheila Robinson
 Nicolas Diegman as Jesse Robinson
 Laura Harling as Meghan Robinson
 Richard Lintern as Graham Scofield
 Robert Sherman as George Giffard
 Jean-François Wolff as Elson Garrett
 Ted Rusoff as Humphrey Garrett
 Christian Erickson as Jack Mennias
 Claudette Roche as Dr. Hollings
 Gary Beadle as Stuart Markle
 Mark O'Hagan as Young Elson
 Jody Scott as Helen Norris (deleted scene-uncredited)

Filming locations 
Although the movie takes place in Ulster County, New York, in the fictional city Chesapequa, it was filmed in various cities in Luxembourg such as scenes in the forested area of Berdorf called the Mullerthal Trail. It is a popular tourist attraction that leads to many caves such as the famous Hohllay Cave.

Select American Cable Broadcast History 
 November 12, 1998 - UPN
 April 1, 1999 - UPN
 October 21, 2000 - FOX Family
 January 18, 2001 - FOX Family
 February 25, 2001 - FOX Family
 March 3, 2001 - FOX Family
 June 3, 2001 - FOX Family
 August 19, 2001 - FOX Family
 October 20, 2001 - FOX Family
 October 26, 2001 - FOX Family
 October 31, 2001 - FOX Family
 November 17, 2001 - ABC Family
 December 30, 2001 - ABC Family
 January 31, 2002 - ABC Family
 March 3, 2002 - ABC Family
 October 19, 2002 - ABC Family
 October 23, 2002 - ABC Family
 October 24, 2002 - ABC Family
 May 19, 2007 - TNT

Home media 
United States: 
On June 15, 2010, Lost Souls was released on DVD by Echo Bridge Home Entertainment in several double feature DVD packs.

Filmrise acquired distribution rights in 2019, and it is available to watch On Demand through Amazon Prime Video.

Germany: On May 16, 2014, Lost Souls was released on DVD by Pidax film media Ltd., with the title Haus der verlorenen Seelen.

Japan: In 2000, Lost Souls was released on VHS.

Certifications 
The film originally aired on Television under the rating of TV-PG, but was not submitted for rating for home media in the United States, and a "Not Rated" certification with "Brief Profanity" is listed on the DVD releases by Echo Bridge Home Entertainment.

References

External links
 

1998 films
1998 television films
1990s mystery thriller films
1990s science fiction horror films
1990s supernatural thriller films
1990s science fiction drama films
1990s thriller drama films
1990s mystery drama films
American mystery thriller films
American science fiction television films
American science fiction thriller films
American supernatural thriller films
American thriller drama films
Films about autism
Films about child death
Films about families
Films about murder
Films set in New York (state)
Films shot in Luxembourg
American science fiction drama films
UPN original films
1998 drama films
American drama television films
1990s English-language films
1990s American films